Twice the Love is a 1988 studio album by George Benson that was recorded with six production teams. The two main singles off the record were the title track "Twice the Love" and the Curtis Mayfield song "Let's Do It Again" which was a No. 1 hit for The Staple Singers in 1975.

Reception

Like some of Benson's other pop albums, Twice the Love was criticized for the lack of guitar playing and creative jazz influence, generally labeled as an "attempt to chase the charts".

Track listing

Personnel 

Musicians:
 George Benson – lead vocals (all tracks), guitar (1, 3-6, 9, 11), lead guitar (8)
 Preston Glass – keyboards (1), bass sequencing (1), drum programming (1), arrangements (1)
 Jay Graydon – synthesizers (2), drums (2), arrangements (2)
 Randy Kerber – synthesizers (2)
 Claude Gaudette – keyboards (3, 4), arrangements (3, 4)
 Wayne Lewis – keyboards (5, 6), drum programming (6)
 Rich Aronson – additional keyboards (5), programming (6), synthesizer sweetening (6)
 Kevin Deane – additional keyboards (5)
 Jonathan Lewis – additional programming (5), programming (6)
 Barry Eastmond – keyboards (7, 8, 10), string arrangements and conductor (7, 8, 10), rhythm track arrangements (7, 8, 10)
 Eric Rehl – synthesizers (7, 8, 10)
 Jason Miles – synthesizer programming (9)
 David Garfield – keyboards (11)
 Bob Baldwin – synthesizer programming (11), drum programming (11), arrangements (11)
 Stephen Fox – synthesizer programming (11), drum programming (11), arrangements (11)
 Michael Urbaniak – synthesizer programming (11), drum programming (11), arrangements (11)
 Dean Parks – guitar (2)
 Paul Jackson, Jr. – guitar (3, 4), additional guitar (5)
 Andy Bloch – guitar (6)
 Ira Siegel – guitar (7, 8, 10)
 Abraham Laboriel – bass (2)
 Neil Stubenhaus – bass (3, 4)
 Marcus Miller – bass (6), all other instruments than guitar (9)
 Wayne Brathwaite – bass (7, 8, 10), rhythm track arrangements (7, 8, 10), drum machine programming (8)
 Bill Champlin – drums (2), backing vocals (2), arrangements (2)
 Dennis Matkosky – drums (2), arrangements (2)
 Mike Baird –  drums (3, 4)
 David Lewis – drum programming (5, 6), additional keyboards (6), additional guitar (6), synthesizer bass (6)
 Terry Silverlight – drums (7, 10)
 Lenny Castro – percussion (3, 4)
 Bashiri Johnson – percussion (7, 8, 10)
 Bobby Caldwell – arrangements (2)
 Gene Page – synthesizer sweetening arrangements (6)
 Richard Henrickson – concertmaster for strings (7, 8)
 Frankie Blue – backing vocals (1)
 Alex Brown – backing vocals (1)
 Cliff Dawson – backing vocals (1)
 Angel Rogers – backing vocals (1)
 Jason Scheff – backing vocals (2)
 Siedah Garrett – backing vocals (3, 4)
 Franne Golde – backing vocals (3)
 Niki Haris – backing vocals (3, 4)
 Dennis Lambert – backing vocals (3)
 Phil Perry – backing vocals (3, 4)
 Yolanda Lee – backing vocals (5)
 Cindy Mizelle – backing vocals (5)
 Vaneese Thomas – backing vocals (5-8, 10)
 Genobia Jeter – backing vocals (6)
 Audrey Wheeler – backing vocals (6)
 Phillip Ballou – backing vocals (7, 10)
 Ethel Beatty – backing vocals (7, 8, 10)
 Thomas Flammia – backing vocals (7, 10)
 Curtis King – backing vocals (7)
 Diane Garisto – backing vocals (8)

Technical:
 Maureen Droney – engineer and mixing (1)
 Jay Graydon – engineer and mixing (2)
 Mick Guzauski – mixing (2)
 David Bianco – recording and mixing (3, 4)
 Bino Espinoza – recording (3, 4)
 Jim Boyer – engineer (5, 9, 11) mixing (9, 11)
 Earl Cohen – mixing (5, 6), engineer (6)
 Carl Beatty – engineer and mixing (7, 8, 10)
 Les Cooper – assistant engineer (1)
 Mark Cretella – assistant engineer (1, 3, 4, 5-11)
 Jeff Lorenzen – assistant engineer (1)
 Mitch Zelezny – assistant engineer (1)
 Jamie Chaleff – assistant engineer (3, 4)
 Jeff Poe – assistant engineer (3, 4)
 Tim Leitner – assistant engineer (5, 9, 11)
 Erik Zobler – additional engineer (5)
 Iris Cohen – assistant engineer (6, 7, 8, 10)
 Mike Russo – assistant engineer (6)
 John Wise – assistant engineer (6)
 Fernando Kral – assistant engineer (7, 8, 10)
 George Pappadapoulous – assistant engineer (7, 8, 10)
 Mark Pattis – assistant engineer (7, 8, 10)
 Bruce Robbins – technical assistant (7, 8, 10)
 Doug Sax – mastering at The Mastering Lab (Los Angeles, CA).

Additional Credits:
 George Benson – executive producer
 Tommy LiPuma – album sequencing
 Valerie Hobel – production assistant (2)
 Marrianne Pellicci – production coordinator (3, 4)
 Lu Snead – project administrator
 Pamela Byers – album package coordinator
 Mary Ann Dibs – art direction and design
 Robert Hakalski – photography
 Terry Robertson – illustration
 Ken Fritz Management, LA – direction

Charts

Certifications

References 

George Benson albums
1988 albums
Albums produced by Tommy LiPuma
Warner Records albums